Wessel de Jonge (born 1957) is a Dutch architect, architectural historian and Professor Heritage & Design at the Department of Architectural Engineering and Technology of the TU Delft. He is specialized in the restoration and re-use of 20th century buildings. The organization grew over the years towards 73 chapters worldwide.

Renovation works
 Zonnestraal (estate), former Sanatorium Zonnestraal of 1928–31 with Bierman Henket Architects
 Dutch pavilion, the Gerrit Rietveld's Biennale Pavilion in Venice of 1953-1954
 Van Nelle Factory in Rotterdam (1928–31)
 Former Technical Schools in Groningen (1923)
 St.Jobs warehouse (1914)
 HUF building (1953) in Rotterdam
 Social Security Building GAK (1959)
 National Aerospace Laboratories NLR in Amsterdam from the 1950s
 Revitalisation of 1938 Olympic Stadium in Helsinki

Publications (selection) 
 Paul Meurs and Marie-Therese van Thoor (eds.), "Zonnestraal Sanatorium - The History and Restoration of a Modern Monument", 18 articles by Hubert-Jan Henket, Ton Idsinga, Wessel de Jonge, Jan Molema, Bruno Reichlin et al., Rotterdam 2010.
 Marieke Kuipers, Wessel de Jonge. Designing from Heritage: Strategies for Conservation and Conversion. TU Delft, 2017.

References

External links
Prof.ir. W. de Jonge at tudelft.nl

1957 births
Living people
Dutch architects
Delft University of Technology alumni